Poraj may refer to:
Poraj coat of arms
Poraj, Lublin Voivodeship (east Poland)
Poraj, Łódź Voivodeship (central Poland)
Poraj, Subcarpathian Voivodeship (south-east Poland)
Poraj, Świętokrzyskie Voivodeship (south-central Poland)
Poraj, Greater Poland Voivodeship (west-central Poland)
Poraj, Silesian Voivodeship (south Poland)
Poraj, Pomeranian Voivodeship (north Poland)

See also